This is a list of people from Bursa who have become known internationally in different roles and professions. Bursa is a city in northwestern Turkey. It is the fourth most populous city in Turkey and is one of the most industrialized metropolitan centers in the country.

Renowned people from Bursa
 Qādī Zāda al-Rūmī - astronomer and mathematician
 Manolis Andronikos (1919–1992) - Greek archaeologist
 Emre Aşık - international footballer
 Ömer Aşık - international basketballer
 Hande Ataizi - actress
 Vildan Atasever - actress
 Bayezid I - fourth Ottoman Empire ruler
 Celal Bayar - former Turkish president
 Behice Boran - the leader of the socialist Workers Party of Turkey
 İhsan Sabri Çağlayangil - politician
 Erkan Can - actor
 Özhan Canaydın - former basketball player, businessman and the former chairman of Galatasaray
 Dio Chrysostom - Greek orator, writer, philosopher and historian of the Roman Empire
 Muazzez İlmiye Çığ - archaeologist
 Mercan Dede - Turkish musician
 Ata Demirer - comedian
 Halil Ergün - actor
 Sabiha Gökçen - the first Turkish female aviator
 Tarkan Gozubuyuk - Pentagram and Mezarkabul bass guitar player and producer
 Kerem Kanter (born 1995) – basketball player
 Pınar Kür - author
 Serdar Kurtuluş - international footballer
 Mehmed I - fifth Ottoman Empire ruler
 Murad I - third Ottoman Empire ruler
 Zeki Müren -  singer, "sun of art"
 Vedat Okyar - footballer
 Emin Fahrettin Özdilek - Prime Minister of Turkey
 Erdal Özyağcılar - actor
 Hamit Şare - Olympic skier
 Müzeyyen Senar – singer, state artist of Turkey
 Olgun Şimşek - actor
 Sporus of Nicaea - Greek mathematician and astronomer
 Nur Sürer - actress
 Sercan Yıldırım - international footballer
 Okan Yılmaz - international footballer
 Zofia Potocka - Greek - Russian agent

 
Bursa